Walsinghamiella eques is a moth of the family Pterophoridae. It is known from Ghana.

References

Endemic fauna of Ghana
Pterophorinae
Insects of West Africa
Moths of Africa
Moths described in 1891